The 7th United States Congress was a meeting of the legislative branch of the United States federal government, consisting of the United States Senate and the United States House of Representatives. It met in Washington, D.C. from March 4, 1801, to March 4, 1803, during the first two years of Thomas Jefferson's presidency. The apportionment of seats in the House of Representatives was based on the 1790 United States census. Both chambers had a Democratic-Republican majority, except during the Special session of the Senate, when there was a Federalist majority in the Senate.

Major events

 March 4, 1801: Thomas Jefferson became President of the United States.
 May 10, 1801: The pascha of Tripoli declared war on United States by having the flagpole on the consulate chopped down
 March 16, 1802: West Point established
 February 24, 1803: First time an Act of Congress was declared unconstitutional: U.S. Supreme Court case, Marbury v. Madison

Major legislation

 April 29, 1802: Judiciary Act of 1802, ch. 31, 
 April 30, 1802: Enabling Act of 1802, ch. 40,

States admitted

 Ohio was admitted as a state, having previously been a portion of the Northwest Territory. The exact date is unclear and in dispute, but it is undisputed that it was during this Congress. The official date when Ohio became a state was not set until 1953, when the 83rd U.S. Congress passed legislation retrospectively designating the date of the first meeting of the Ohio state legislature, March 1, 1803, as that date. However, on April 30, 1802, the 7th U.S. Congress had passed an act "authorizing the inhabitants of Ohio to form a Constitution and state government, and admission of Ohio into the Union." (Sess. 1, ch. 40) On February 19, 1803, the same Congress passed an act "providing for the execution of the laws of the United States in the State of Ohio." (Sess. 2, ch. 7) The Biographical Directory of the United States Congress states that Ohio was admitted to the Union on November 29, 1802, and counts its seats as vacant from that date.

Party summary
The count below identifies party affiliations at the beginning of the first session of this Congress, and includes members from vacancies and newly admitted states, when they were first seated. Changes resulting from subsequent replacements are shown below in the "Changes in membership" section.

Senate 
Although the Federalists had more senators during the very brief March 1801 special session, by the time the first regular session met in December 1801, the Democratic-Republicans had gained majority control.

House of Representatives

Leadership

Senate

 President: Aaron Burr (DR)
 President pro tempore: Abraham Baldwin (DR), first elected December 7, 1801
 Stephen R. Bradley (DR), first elected December 14, 1802

House of Representatives
 Speaker: Nathaniel Macon, (DR), elected December 7, 1801

Members
This list is arranged by chamber, then by state. Senators are listed by class, and representatives are listed by district.

Senate
Skip to House of Representatives, below
Senators were elected by the state legislatures every two years, with one-third beginning new six-year terms with each Congress. Preceding the names in the list below are Senate class numbers, which indicate the cycle of their election. In this Congress, Class 1 meant their term ended with this Congress, facing re-election in 1802; Class 2 meant their term began in the last Congress, facing re-election in 1804; and Class 3 meant their term began in this Congress, facing re-election in 1806.

Connecticut 
 1. James Hillhouse (F)
 3. Uriah Tracy (F)

Delaware 
 1. Samuel White (F)
 2. William H. Wells (F)

Georgia 
 2. Abraham Baldwin (DR)
 3. James Jackson (DR)

Kentucky 
 2. John Brown (DR)
 3. John Breckinridge (DR)

Maryland 
 1. John Eager Howard (F)
 3. William Hindman (F), until November 19, 1801
 Robert Wright (DR), from November 19, 1801

Massachusetts 
 1. Jonathan Mason (F)
 2. Dwight Foster (F), until March 2, 1803

New Hampshire 
 2. Samuel Livermore (F), until June 12, 1801
 Simeon Olcott (F), from June 17, 1801
 3. James Sheafe (F), until June 14, 1802
 William Plumer (F), from June 17, 1802

New Jersey 
 1. Aaron Ogden (F)
 2. Jonathan Dayton (F)

New York 
 1. Gouverneur Morris (F)
 3. John Armstrong Jr. (DR), until February 5, 1802
 DeWitt Clinton (DR), from February 9, 1802

North Carolina 
 2. Jesse Franklin (DR)
 3. David Stone (DR)

Ohio 
Due to uncertainty over Ohio's exact admittance date (see "States admitted, above") its two senators were not elected until the next Congress.
 1: Vacant (newly admitted state)
 3: Vacant (newly admitted state)

Pennsylvania 
 1. James Ross (F)
 3. Peter Muhlenberg (DR), until June 30, 1801
 George Logan (DR), from July 13, 1801

Rhode Island 
 1. Theodore Foster (F)
 2. Ray Greene (F), until March 5, 1801
 Christopher Ellery (DR), from May 6, 1801

South Carolina 
 2. Charles Pinckney (DR), until June 6, 1801
 Thomas Sumter (DR), from December 15, 1801
 3. John E. Colhoun (DR), until October 26, 1802
 Pierce Butler (DR), from November 4, 1802

Tennessee 
 1. Joseph Anderson (DR)
 2. William Cocke (DR)

Vermont 
 1. Nathaniel Chipman (F)
 3. Elijah Paine (F), until September 1, 1801
 Stephen R. Bradley (DR), from October 15, 1801

Virginia 
 1. Stevens T. Mason (DR)
 2. Wilson C. Nicholas (DR)

House of Representatives
The names of members of the House of Representatives elected statewide on the general ticket or otherwise at-large, are preceded by an "At-large," and the names of those elected from districts, whether plural or single member, are preceded by their district numbers.

Connecticut
All representatives were elected statewide on a general ticket.
 . Samuel W. Dana (F)
 . John Davenport (F)
 . Calvin Goddard (F), from May 14, 1801
 . Roger Griswold (F)
 . Elias Perkins (F)
 . John Cotton Smith (F)
 . Benjamin Tallmadge (F), from September 21, 1801

Delaware
 . James A. Bayard (F)

Georgia
All representatives were elected statewide on a general ticket.
 . John Milledge (DR), until May 1802
 Peter Early (DR), from January 10, 1803
 . Benjamin Taliaferro (DR), until May 1802
 David Meriwether (DR), from December 6, 1802

Kentucky
 . Thomas T. Davis (DR)
 . John Fowler (DR)

Maryland
 . John Campbell (F)
 . Richard Sprigg Jr. (DR), until February 11, 1802
 Walter Bowie (DR), from March 24, 1802
 . Thomas Plater (F)
 . Daniel Hiester (DR)
 . Samuel Smith (DR)
 . John Archer (DR)
 . Joseph H. Nicholson (DR)
 . John Dennis (F)

Massachusetts
 . John Bacon (DR)
 . William Shepard (F)
 . Ebenezer Mattoon (F)
 . Levi Lincoln Sr. (DR), until March 5, 1801
 Seth Hastings (F), from January 11, 1802
 . Lemuel Williams (F)
 . Josiah Smith (DR)
 . Phanuel Bishop (DR)
 . William Eustis (DR)
 . Joseph Bradley Varnum (DR)
 . Nathan Read (F)
 . Manasseh Cutler (F)
 . Silas Lee (F), until August 20, 1801
 Samuel Thatcher (F), from December 6, 1802
 . Peleg Wadsworth (F)
 . Richard Cutts (DR), from December 7, 1801

New Hampshire
All representatives were elected statewide on a general ticket.
 . Abiel Foster (F)
 . Joseph Peirce (F), until June 1802
 Samuel Hunt (F), from December 6, 1802
 . Samuel Tenney (F)
 . George B. Upham (F)

New Jersey
All representatives were elected statewide on a general ticket.
 . John Condit (DR)
 . Ebenezer Elmer (DR)
 . William Helms (DR)
 . James Mott (DR)
 . Henry Southard (DR)

New York
 . John Smith (DR)
 . Samuel L. Mitchill (DR)
 . Philip Van Cortlandt (DR)
 . Lucas C. Elmendorf (DR)
 . Thomas Tillotson (DR), until August 10, 1801
 Theodorus Bailey (DR), from December 7, 1801
 . John Bird (F), until July 25, 1801
 John P. Van Ness (DR), December 7, 1801 – January 17, 1803; vacant thereafter
 . David Thomas (DR)
 . Killian K. Van Rensselaer (F)
 . Benjamin Walker (F)
 . Thomas Morris (F)

North Carolina
 . James Holland (DR)
 . Archibald Henderson (F)
 . Robert Williams (DR)
 . Richard Stanford (DR)
 . Nathaniel Macon (DR)
 . William H. Hill (F)
 . William Barry Grove (F)
 . Charles Johnson (DR), until July 23, 1802
 Thomas Wynns (DR), from December 7, 1802
 . Willis Alston (F)
 . John Stanly (F)

Ohio
 . vacant (newly admitted state)

Pennsylvania
 . William Jones (DR)
 . Michael Leib (DR)
 . Joseph Hemphill (F)
 : Robert Brown (DR)
 : Isaac Van Horne (DR)
 . Joseph Hiester (DR)
 . John A. Hanna (DR)
 . Thomas Boude (F)
 . John Stewart (DR)
 . Andrew Gregg (DR)
 . Henry Woods (F)
 . John Smilie (DR)
 . William Hoge (DR)

Rhode Island
Both representatives were elected statewide on a general ticket.
 . Joseph Stanton Jr. (DR)
 . Thomas Tillinghast (DR)

South Carolina
 . Thomas Lowndes (F)
 . John Rutledge Jr. (F)
 . Benjamin Huger (F)
 . Thomas Sumter (DR), until December 15, 1801
 Richard Winn (DR), from January 24, 1802
 . William Butler Sr. (DR)
 . Thomas Moore (DR)

Tennessee
 . William Dickson (DR)

Vermont
 . Israel Smith (DR)
 . Lewis R. Morris (F)

Virginia
 . John Smith (DR)
 . David Holmes (DR)
 . George Jackson (DR)
 . Abram Trigg (DR)
 . John J. Trigg (DR)
 . Matthew Clay (DR)
 . John Randolph (DR)
 . Thomas Claiborne (DR)
 . William B. Giles (DR)
 . Edwin Gray (DR)
 . Thomas Newton Jr. (DR)
 . John Stratton (F)
 . John Clopton (DR)
 . Samuel J. Cabell (DR)
 . John Dawson (DR)
 . Anthony New (DR)
 . Richard Brent (DR)
 . Philip R. Thompson (DR)
 . John Taliaferro (DR)

Non-voting members
 . Narsworthy Hunter, until March 11, 1802
 Thomas M. Green Jr. (DR), from December 6, 1802
 . Paul Fearing (F)

Changes in membership
The count below reflects changes from the beginning of the first session of this Congress.

Senate
There was 1 death, 8 resignations, and 2 seats added for a new state.

|-
| Rhode Island(2)
|  | Ray Greene (F)
| Resigned March 5, 1801, after being nominated for a judicial position.  His successor was elected.
|  | Christopher Ellery (DR)
| Seated May 6, 1801

|-
| South Carolina(2)
|  | Charles Pinckney (DR)
| Resigned June 6, 1801, after being appointed Minister to Spain.  His successor was elected.
|  | Thomas Sumter (DR)
| Seated December 15, 1801

|-
| New Hampshire(2)
|  | Samuel Livermore (F)
| Resigned June 12, 1801.  His successor was elected.
|  | Simeon Olcott (F)
| Seated June 17, 1801

|-
| Pennsylvania(3)
|  | Peter Muhlenberg (DR)
| Resigned June 30, 1801.  His successor was appointed July 13, 1801, and then elected December 17, 1801.
|  | George Logan (DR)
| Seated July 13, 1801

|-
| Vermont(3)
|  | Elijah Paine (F)
| Resigned September 1, 1801.  His successor was elected.
|  | Stephen R. Bradley (DR)
| Seated October 15, 1801

|-
| Maryland(3)
|  | William Hindman (F)
| Resigned November 19, 1801.  His successor was elected.
|  | Robert Wright (DR)
| Seated November 19, 1801

|-
| Massachusetts(3)
|  | Dwight Foster (F)
| Resigned March 2, 1803. Not filled this Congress
| Vacant

|-
| New York(3)
|  | John Armstrong Jr. (DR)
| Resigned February 5, 1802.  His successor was elected.
|  | DeWitt Clinton (DR)
| Seated February 9, 1802

|-
| New Hampshire(3)
|  | James Sheafe (F)
| Resigned June 14, 1802.  His successor was elected.
|  | William Plumer (F)
| Seated June 17, 1802

|-
| South Carolina(3)
|  | John E. Colhoun (DR)
| Died October 26, 1802.  His successor was elected.
|  | Pierce Butler (DR)
| Seated November 4, 1802

|-
| Ohio(1)
| rowspan=2 | New seats
| rowspan=2 style="font-size:80%" |Ohio was admitted to the Union on November 29, 1802.
| Vacant
| rowspan=2 | Not filled this Congress

|-
| Ohio(3)
| Vacant

|}

House of Representatives
 Replacements: 8
 Democratic-Republicans: no net change
 Federalists: no net change
 Deaths: 1
 Resignations: 9
 Forfeiture: 1
 Vacancy: 1
Total seats with changes: 11

|-
| 
| Vacant
| Elizur Goodrich (F) resigned before the beginning of this Congress.
|  | Calvin Goddard (F)
| May 14, 1801

|-
| 
| Vacant
| William Edmond (F) resigned before the beginning of this Congress.
|  | Benjamin Tallmadge (F)
| September 21, 1801

|-
| 
| Vacant
| Representative-elect George Thatcher declined to serve.Successor    elected June 22, 1801.
|  | Richard Cutts (DR)
| December 7, 1801

|-
| 
|  | Levi Lincoln (DR)
| Resigned March 5, 1801, after being appointed US attorney General.
|  | Seth Hastings (F)
| January 11, 1802

|-
| 
|  | John Bird (F)
| Resigned July 25, 1801.
|  | John Peter Van Ness (DR)
| December 7, 1801

|-
| 
|  | Thomas Tillotson (DR)
| Resigned August 10, 1801, upon appointment as NY Secretary of State.
|  | Theodorus Bailey (DR)
| December 7, 1801

|-
| 
|  | Silas Lee (F)
| Resigned August 20, 1801.
|  | Samuel Thatcher (F)
| December 6, 1802

|-
| 
|  | Thomas Sumter (DR)
| Resigned December 15, 1801, after being elected to the US Senate.
|  | Richard Winn (DR)
| January 24, 1802

|-
| 
|  | Benjamin Taliaferro (DR)
| Resigned sometime in 1802.
|  | David Meriwether (DR)
| December 6, 1802

|-
| 
|  | Joseph Peirce (F)
| Resigned sometime in 1802.
|  | Samuel Hunt (F)
| December 6, 1802

|-
| 
|  | Richard Sprigg Jr. (DR)
| Resigned February 11, 1802.
|  | Walter Bowie (DR)
| March 24, 1802

|-
| 
| Narsworthy Hunter
| Died March 11, 1802.
| Thomas M. Green Jr.
| December 6, 1802

|-
| 
|  | John Milledge (DR)
| Resigned May 1802 after being elected Governor.
|  | Peter Early (DR)
| January 10, 1803

|-
| 
|  | Charles Johnson (DR)
| Died July 23, 1802.
|  | Thomas Wynns (DR)
| December 7, 1802

|-
| 
| New seat
| Ohio was admitted to the Union on November 29, 1802.
| Vacant
| rowspan=2 | Not filled until next Congress

|-
| 
|  | John Peter Van Ness (DR)
| Seat declared forfeited January 17, 1803.
| Vacant

|}

Committees
Lists of committees and their party leaders.

Senate
 Whole

House of Representatives
 Claims (Chairman: John C. Smith)
 Commerce and Manufactures (Chairman: Samuel Smith)
 Elections (Chairman: John Milledge then John Bacon)
 Revisal and Unfinished Business (Chairman: John Davenport)
 Rules (Select) 
 Standards of Official Conduct (Chairman: N/A)
 Ways and Means (Chairman: John Randolph)
 Whole

Joint committees
 Enrolled Bills (Chairman: Dwight Foster)

Officers

Legislative branch agency directors
 Architect of the Capitol: William Thornton
 Librarian of Congress: John J. Beckley, from 1802

Senate
 Chaplain: Thomas J. Claggett (Episcopalian), until December 9, 1801
 Edward Gantt (Episcopalian), elected December 9, 1801
 Secretary: Samuel A. Otis
 Doorkeeper: James Mathers

House of Representatives
 Chaplain: Thomas Lyell (Methodist), until December 10, 1801 
 William Parkinson (Baptist), elected December 10, 1801
 Clerk: John Holt Oswald, until December 7, 1801
 John Beckley, elected December 7, 1801
 Doorkeeper: Thomas Claxton
 Reading Clerks: 
 Sergeant at Arms: Joseph Wheaton

See also 
 1800 United States elections (elections leading to this Congress)
 1800 United States presidential election
 1800–01 United States Senate elections
 1800–01 United States House of Representatives elections
 1802 United States elections (elections during this Congress, leading to the next Congress)
 1802–03 United States Senate elections
 1802–03 United States House of Representatives elections

Notes

References

External links
 Statutes at Large, 1789-1875
 Senate Journal, First Forty-three Sessions of Congress
 House Journal, First Forty-three Sessions of Congress
 Biographical Directory of the U.S. Congress
 U.S. House of Representatives: House History
 U.S. Senate: Statistics and Lists